The City of Imus Grandstand and Track Oval (CIGTO) is a football and athletics stadium in Imus, Cavite, Philippines. It was inaugurated on October 12, 2018 and is situated beside the Ospital ng Imus.

The stadium was among the venues for men's football at the 2019 Southeast Asian Games. It was also used as one of the venues for the 2022 AFF Women's Championship. The venue will also be used as the home stadium of Mendiola 1991 for the 2022–23 Philippines Football League season,

It also served as the venue for Panfilo Lacson campaign for the 2022 Philippine presidential election.

References

Athletics (track and field) venues in the Philippines
Football venues in the Philippines
Buildings and structures in Imus
Sports in Cavite
Sports venues completed in 2018